George Herbert Whitney (August 19, 1863 – April 22, 1928) was an American pharmacist and politician from New York.

Life

Whitney was born on August 19, 1863, in Stockbridge, Massachusetts, and was the son of George Fenn Whitney.

He attended the public schools in Stockbridge, and then began to work as a drugstore clerk, first in Castleton-on-Hudson, New York, then in Hudson, New York, and then in New Haven, Connecticut.

Career
In 1884, he passed the New York State pharmacy exam, the next year began managing his brother-in-law's drugstore in Mechanicville, and succeeded to the business in 1887. He was treasurer of Mechanicville for two terms; and supervisor of Halfmoon for several terms beginning in 1898.

Whitney was a member of the New York State Assembly (Saratoga Co.) in 1903, 1904, 1905, 1906, 1907, 1908, 1909, 1910 and 1912; and was Chairman of the Committee on Public Health in 1908, on Internal Affairs in 1909 and 1910, and on Ways and Means in 1912.

He was a member of the New York State Senate (30th D.) from 1913 to 1918, sitting in the 136th, 137th, 138th, 139th, 140th and 141st New York State Legislatures. He was a member of the New York State Commission for the Panama–Pacific International Exposition in 1915.

Personal life
In 1888, Whitney was married to Martha McGiffert (1865–1950).

Whitney died of a heart attack on April 22, 1928, in Mechanicville, Saratoga County, New York.

Sources

External links

1863 births
1928 deaths
Republican Party New York (state) state senators
People from Mechanicville, New York
Republican Party members of the New York State Assembly
People from Stockbridge, Massachusetts
People from Rensselaer County, New York
People from Halfmoon, New York